Government High School, Honagera is a school in Yadgir District of Karnataka state, India. The school is adjacent to Honagera Primary Health Center and Higher Primary School.

The school is Kannada medium, with Kannada taught as main language.

Classes
Classes between eighth to tenth are taught from morning 9:30 till evening 4:30 with lunch break from afternoon 1:00 to 1:45.

References

Schools in Yadgir district
High schools and secondary schools in Karnataka